Kamal lake (Nepali: कमल ताल), also called Rukmani lake (Nepali: रुक्मिणी ताल), is located in Rukum district of western Nepal. The lake is popular for lotus flower. The surface area of the lake is about 2 km2.

See also
List of lakes of Nepal

References

Lakes of Nepal
Rivers of Lumbini Province